Steubenville is an unincorporated community in Steuben Township, Steuben County, in the U.S. state of Indiana.

History
Steubenville was a choice for the county seat of Steuben County in 1841. It was also a train stop for a short time before it was moved to Angola.

A post office was established at Steubenville in 1839, and remained in operation until it was discontinued in 1932.

Geography

References

Unincorporated communities in Steuben County, Indiana
Unincorporated communities in Indiana